Omerbožovići is a village in the municipality of Tuzi, Montenegro. It is located just east of Podgorica.

Demographics
According to the 2011 census, its population was 193.

References

Populated places in Tuzi Municipality
Albanian communities in Montenegro